The C. Y. Tung Maritime Museum (董浩云航运博物馆 Dǒng Hàoyún Hángyùn Bówùguǎn) is located in the Shanghai Jiao Tong University in Shanghai, China.

Overview
The museum houses the Chinese Maritime History Gallery and the C. Y. Tung Gallery. The former contains a permanent exhibition of maps, photographs, archival material, maritime trade routes and their artifacts, reflecting China's maritime history since the Neolithic period. The latter portrays the Chinese shipping magnate C. Y. Tung. Especially remarkable is the large collection of ship models ranging from Zheng He's treasure ship to the world largest ship, the Seawise Giant.

Location
The C. Y. Tung Maritime Museum is located in the Xuhui campus of Shanghai Jiao Tong University. The two-story, western-style building with a central courtyard was built 1910, serving as a student residence.

See also
 List of museums in China

References

External links
 Museum website

Museums with year of establishment missing
Museums established in 1910
Museums in Shanghai
Maritime museums in China
University museums in China
Biographical museums in China
Shanghai Jiao Tong University
Xuhui District